Strigomerodes is a genus of beetles in the family Carabidae, containing the following species:
 Strigomerodes basilewskyi Straneo, 1948
 Strigomerodes burgeoni (Straneo, 1939)
 Strigomerodes laevis (Burgeon, 1935)
 Strigomerodes patrizii Straneo, 1941
 Strigomerodes punctifrons Straneo, 1949
 Strigomerodes singularis (Burgeon, 1935)
 Strigomerodes uelensis (Burgeon, 1935)

References

Pterostichinae